Sore Demo Kita Michi (It Nevertheless, Is the Road I Came From) is Japanese singer Jun Shibata's 2nd single. It was released on February 20, 2002 and peaked at #90.

Track listing
Sore demo kita michi (それでも来た道; It Nevertheless Is the Road I Came From)
Henshin (変身; Metamorphosis)
Yoru no umi ni tachi...: Hikigatari Version (夜の海に立ち…～弾き語りバージョン～; On the Beach at Night...: Hikigatari Version) 1

1Hikigatari means to sing to one's own accompaniment.

Charts

External links
http://www.shibatajun.com— Shibata Jun Official Website 

2002 singles
Jun Shibata songs